Uturuncu is a dormant volcano in the Sur Lípez Province of Bolivia. It bears traces of a former glaciation, even though it does not currently carry glaciers. Volcanic activity took place during the Pleistocene epoch and the last eruption was 250,000 years ago; since then Uturuncu has not erupted but active fumaroles occur in the summit region, between the two summits.

Underneath it lies the so-called Altiplano–Puna magmatic body, a large sill formed by partially molten rocks.

Starting in 1992, satellite observations have indicated a large area of regional uplift centered on Uturuncu, which has been interpreted as an indication of large-scale magma intrusion under the volcano. This might be a prelude to large-scale volcanic activity, including "supervolcanic" activity and caldera formation.

Geography and geomorphology 
Uturuncu lies in the San Pablo de Lípez municipality of the Sur Lípez area of southern Bolivia, southeast of the town of Quetena and just northeast of the Eduardo Avaroa Andean Fauna National Reserve in the Cordillera de Lípez. The region is almost uninhabited and the volcano was little known until ongoing large-scale ground deformation was discovered in the early 21st century; since then scientific interest and activity has increased, including a reconnaissance mission carried out by scientists in 2003, and numerous geophysical studies have been carried out on the volcano. The volcano has been used to reconstruct the regional history of glaciation. The term  means 'jaguar' in the Quechua language. Today Uturuncu is a tourism target.

It was first ascended in 1955 by Friedrich Adolf Ernest Ahlfeld (Germany), but like other volcanoes in the Puna region miners and native inhabitants may have ascended it earlier. A former sulfur mine named "Uturuncu" is situated on the mountain, close to the summit, and was considered to be one of the highest in the world. It reportedly contained reserves of 50million tons of ore, consisting mainly of sulfur with some realgar which is dispersed among tephra deposits and contains large amounts of arsenic. A winding road that served the sulfur mine leads up the mountain, and roads pass along the northern, eastern and southwestern feet of Uturuncu.

Structure 

Uturuncu is a stratovolcano with remnants of a crater, and consists of lava domes and lava flows erupted from a number of vents in the central part of the volcano. 

The northernmost lava flow is known as Lomo Escapa and with a length of  it is also the largest lava flow at Uturuncu.

It appears to consist entirely of lava flows and lava domes; while the occurrence of pyroclastic flow deposits was reported at first, later research has not found any evidence of explosive eruptions. Aside from volcanic deposits there are also traces of glaciation that has smoothened the slopes of Uturuncu, as well as Pleistocene and Holocene alluvium and colluvium.

Lakes and rivers 

Several lakes surround Uturuncu. Mama Khumu lies on the eastern foot of Uturuncu and is bordered by steep slopes; Laguna Celeste is located northeast of Uturuncu, Chojllas southeast of the volcano and Loromayu to the south. The first two receive their inflow from Uturuncu. Beach terraces, deposits of diatomaceous earth and former shorelines are visible around the lakes. The Rio Grande de Lípez flows along the western foot of the volcano and receives tributaries which originate close to Uturuncu's northeastern foot; it eventually flows into the Salar de Uyuni. These watercourses are usually confined between steep bedrock walls and are characterized by gravelly beds, anastomosing channels and wetlands that are used to keep llamas and sheep.

Geology

Regional 

The eastward subduction of the Nazca Plate beneath the South American Plate has generated three volcanic belts within the Andes, including the Central Volcanic Zone, which spans parts of Peru, Chile, Bolivia and Argentina and includes Uturuncu. Aside from Uturuncu, it includes about 69 Holocene volcanoes in a high elevation region, such as the potentially active volcanoes Irruputuncu, Olca-Paruma, Aucanquilcha, Ollagüe, Azufre, San Pedro, Putana, Sairecabur, Licancabur, Guayaques, Colachi and Acamarachi.

Local 

The Vilama (8.41 mya old) and Guacha (5.65 mya old) ignimbrites underlie the volcano and crop out in the Quetena River valley. The Vilama lavas (4 mya old) are found southwest of Uturuncu and are partly buried by the volcano.

Volcanic activity in the area occurred between 15and 10mya ago. Cerro San Antonio, a Miocene volcano with a westward-opening collapse scar, lies just north of Uturuncu. It is heavily eroded and 3 mya old. Other volcanoes from east counterclockwise to west are the Cerro Panizos caldera, Cerro Lípez, Suni K'ira and Quetena volcanoes as well as many more minor volcanic centres. Many of them formed along northwest–southeast trending lineaments such as the Lipez-Coranzuli and Pastos Grandes-Cojina lineament that passes through Uturuncu.

Geologic history and Altiplano–Puna volcanic complex 

The geological history of the region is complex. After subduction commenced in the Jurassic, 26 mya ago the breakup of the Farallon Plate into the Cocos Plate and the Nazca Plate was accompanied by an increased subduction rate and the onset of the Andean Orogeny. This subduction process at first involved a relatively flat descent of the Nazca Plate until 12 mya ago, after which it steepened. The Altiplano–Puna volcanic complex formed beginning 10 mya ago, with a volcanic flare-up occurring during the Miocene. 

Uturuncu lies at its centre but unlike it most surrounding volcanic systems have been characterized by explosive eruptions, including several so-called "supereruptions" with Volcanic Explosivity Indexes of 8 at Cerro Guacha, La Pacana, Pastos Grandes and Vilama. Over 50volcanoes in the region are potentially active.

Within the last two mya, the Laguna Colorada, Tatio and Puripica Chico ignimbrites were erupted in the surrounding terrain. The Atana (4mya old) and Pastos Grandes (3mya old) ignimbrites are other large ignimbrites in the area while the San Antonio ignimbrite (10.33±0.64mya old) is more sparse.

The Altiplano–Puna volcanic complex is underpinned at about  depth by a wide magmatic sill where rocks are partially molten, the Altiplano–Puna magmatic body. It has been referred to as the largest reservoir of magma in the continental crust of Earth. The Altiplano–Puna magmatic body is the source of magmas for many of the volcanoes in the Altiplano–Puna volcanic complex.

Composition and magma genesis 

Uturuncu has erupted dacite (as well as andesite in the form of inclusions within the dacite). Rocks are vesicular or porphyritic and contain phenocrysts of biotite, clinopyroxene, hornblende, ilmenite, magnetite, orthopyroxene, plagioclase and quartz along with apatite, monazite and zircon within a rhyolite groundmass, and define a potassium-rich calc-alkaline suite. Xenoliths consisting of gneiss, igneous rocks and norites have also been found; the first two appear to be derived from country rocks while the third is a by-product of the magma generation process. Additionally, the occurrence of cumulates, gabbros, hornfels, limestones and sandstones as xenolithic phases has been reported. 

Mixing processes involving hotter or more mafic magmas played a role in the genesis of Uturuncu rocks, as did fractional crystallization processes and contamination with crustal rocks. The origin of these magmas appears to relate to the Altiplano–Puna magmatic body, which generates melts through differentiation of basaltic magmas first to andesites and then to dacites before being transferred to the shallow crust below Uturuncu from where it was then erupted through buoyancy-dependent processes. Magma composition has been stable over the history of the volcano.

Glaciation 

Modern Uturuncu features no glaciers; however, perennial ice was reported in 1956, remnants of snow in 1971, the existence of sporadic snow fields in 1994, and the summit area is occasionally ice-covered. Evidence of past glaciation such as glacial striations, glacially eroded valleys, both recessional and terminal moraines and roches moutonnées can be found on the northern, eastern and southern flanks of Uturuncu. The past glaciation of Uturuncu was not extensive, owing to its steep flanks.

Afterwards, not much retreat occurred until 18,000years ago. During the Pleistocene, the snow line was about  lower than today.

Conversely, the uppermost of these moraines is about 16,000–14,000years old and correlates to a glacial advance in the Altiplano that has been linked to the maximum growth of the former Lake Tauca north of Uturuncu and a wet and cold climate associated with Heinrich event 1. At this same time 17,000–13,000years ago, shorelines formed around the lakes that surround Uturuncu; Lake Tauca may have been a source of moisture for Uturuncu. After 14,000 years ago, the glacier receded at the same time as climate warmed during the Bolling–Allerod warming and the region became drier.

Climate and vegetation 

This low amount of precipitation is not adequate to sustain glaciers even though the summit of Uturuncu lies above the freezing level, but it is enough to generate a seasonal snowcap on the mountain.

The regional vegetation is relatively sparse at high elevations. Polylepis trees are found on the lower slopes of the volcano; the trees reach  in height and form forests. They have been used as a source of tree ring climate records.

Eruption history 

Uturuncu was active during the Pleistocene. A lower unit emplaced during the lower and middle Pleistocene (890,000–549,000years ago) makes up most of the peripheral sectors of the volcano, while an upper unit of middle to upper Pleistocene age (427,000–271,000years ago) forms its central sector and is less extensive. Several rocks have been dated through argon-argon dating and have yielded ages ranging from 1,050,000 ± 5,000to 250,000 ± 5,000years ago. Dates of 271,000 ± 26,000years ago have been obtained from the summit area, 250,000 ± 5,000for the youngest dated lava flow found just south-southeast of the summit and 544,000years for the Lomo Escapa lava flow, while the aligned lava domes have been dated to be between 549,000 ± 3,000 and 1,041,000 ± 12,000years old. Overall, Uturuncu was active for about 800,000years.

Volcanic eruptions at Uturuncu were effusive and involved the emission of voluminous lava flows between pauses lasting between 50,000 and 180,000years. The mean eruption rate was less than -, much less than other rhyolitic volcanoes. There is no evidence of large ignimbrite eruptions nor of large flank collapses but some lavas may have interacted with water or ice as they were erupted and were reportedly emplaced over moraines.

Holocene and fumarolic activity 

No large effusive eruptions have occurred since the 250,000 ± 5,000eruption, and Holocene or recent eruptions have not been reported. At first, it was proposed that postglacial lavas existed, but glaciation has affected the youngest lava flows. The volcano is considered to be dormant.

Active fumaroles occur in two fields below the summit, with a number of tiny vents located between the two summit peaks; vapour emissions are visible from close distance. Their gases contain large quantities of carbon dioxide, water and larger amounts of hydrogen sulfide than sulfur dioxide perhaps due to the latter being filtered out by a hydrothermal system. The fumaroles have emplaced abundant sulfur, and silification has been observed.

The presence of a weak hydrothermal system is likely at Uturuncu although probably at great depth, considering the low temperature and spread out nature of the fumarolic activity.

Recent unrest and threats 

Interferometric synthetic-aperture radar imaging has discovered that a region of about  around Uturuncu is uplifting. The uplift may have begun around 1965 but was first detected in 1992.

This joint uplift-subsidence has been called a "sombrero pattern" and the subsidence may reflect either a sideward or an upward migration of magma. A second, shallow subsidence area has been found south of Uturuncu, which may relate to changes in a hydrothermal system.

The deformation is most likely caused by magma intruding into the crust from the Altiplano–Puna magmatic body, with the intrusion taking place at a level below that where magma accumulated prior to past eruptions of Uturuncu. The more recent changes may instead be a consequence of the upward movement of fluids, rather than magmatic processes. It has been described as an ascending diapir, a plate-shaped intrusion or as a growing pluton although an alternative theory holds the ascent of volatiles along a magma column reaching to the Altiplano–Puna magmatic body as responsible for the surface deformation; in that case the uplift might reverse over time.

Such surface uplift has been observed at other volcanic centres in the Central Volcanic Zone but on a global scale it is unusual both for its long duration and its spatial extent, and in the case of Uturuncu demonstrates the continuing activity of the Altiplano–Puna magmatic body. There is no evidence for a net uplift in the geomorphology of the region, and findings in the terrain around Uturuncu indicate that this uplift certainly began less than 1,000 years ago and likely also less than 100 years ago. The uplift might be either a temporary deformation of the volcano that eventually deflates over time, or the current uplift might only be in its beginning stage. The term 'zombie volcano' has been coined to describe volcanoes like Uturuncu that have been inactive for a long time but are actively deforming.

Seismicity 

In addition, the volcano features persistent seismic activity with occasional bursts of higher activity; about three or four earthquakes occur every day at the volcano, and seismic swarms lasting minutes to hours with up to 60 earthquakes occur several times per month. The intensities of the earthquakes reach magnitude . Most of this seismic activity occurs below the summit of Uturuncu around sea level and some earthquakes appear to relate to the northwest-southeast tectonic trend of the region although swarms occur in several areal clusters. Earthquakes are missing from the depth range of the Altiplano-Puna magmatic body but occur below it, implying that it is underlaid by brittle, cold crust. Whether there are long-term trends in seismic activity is difficult to estimate as the detection and reconnaissance techniques of seismic activity at Uturuncu have changed over time. This amount of seismic activity is large when compared to neighbouring volcanoes and the seismic activity may be a consequence of the deformation, as intruding magma pressurizes and destabilizes local faults, as well as the ascent of fluids in faults and cracks. Further triggering processes are large earthquakes such as the 2010 Maule earthquake, which caused an intense seismic swarm in February 2010.

Tomographic studies 

Magnetotelluric imaging of the volcano has found a number of high-conductivity anomalies below Uturuncu, including a wide, deep conductor that extends to the volcanic arc to the west and several shallower ones which ascend from the deep conductor that appears to coincide with the Altiplano–Puna magmatic body.

Such structures have been found at other volcanoes and explained by the presence of magma. Seismic activity concentrates at the top of this anomaly.

Threats 

Whether the ongoing unrest at Uturuncu is part of a benign process of the growth of a pluton or the prelude of a new eruption or even a caldera-forming eruption is  an open question. A large caldera-forming eruption could have catastrophic, globe-spanning consequences as demonstrated by the 1815 eruption of Mount Tambora in Indonesia and the 1600 eruption of Huaynaputina in Peru; this possibility has resulted in international media attention and in popular culture; the volcano's threat is depicted in the 2016 film Salt and Fire. Evidence does not unequivocally indicate that a future super-eruption such as past events in the region is possible and there is no indication for a near-future eruption, but there is potential for a smaller eruption.

See also
 Geology of Bolivia
 List of volcanoes in Bolivia
 Mount Nelly

Notes

References

Sources 

 
 
 
 
 
 
 
 
 
 
 
 
 
 
 
 
 
 
 
 
 
 
 
 
 
 
 
 
 
 

Volcanoes of Potosí Department
Stratovolcanoes of Bolivia
Potentially active volcanoes
Pleistocene stratovolcanoes
Six-thousanders of the Andes